Wien Ottakring (German for Vienna Ottakring) is a railway station located in the Ottakring district of Vienna, Austria. Opened in 1898, it is owned and operated by the Austrian Federal Railways (ÖBB), and is served by S-Bahn trains.

References

External links 

Ottakring
Buildings and structures in Ottakring
Railway stations opened in 1898
Art Nouveau architecture in Vienna
Art Nouveau railway stations
1898 establishments in Austria
Railway stations in Austria opened in the 19th century